Binta Jambane (born 14 May 1942) is a Mozambican sprinter. She competed in the women's 100 metres at the 1984 Summer Olympics.

References

External links
 

1942 births
Living people
Athletes (track and field) at the 1984 Summer Olympics
Mozambican female sprinters
Olympic athletes of Mozambique
Place of birth missing (living people)
Olympic female sprinters